Jason Timiebi Ogheneobrucheme Bakumo-Abraham (born 28 December 2000), known as Timmy Abraham, is an English professional footballer who plays as a forward for Oldham Athletic, on loan from Walsall.

Personal life
Abraham was born in London to Nigerian parents. He is the brother of Roma and England national team striker Tammy Abraham.

Career

Fulham 
Born in London, Abraham started his career at Charlton Athletic's academy, before joining Fulham in 2017. Abraham featured for the under-21 team in the EFL Trophy, scoring 2 goals in 5 games.

Abraham joined Bristol Rovers on loan in January 2020 until the end of the 2019–20 season. He made his debut on 8 February 2020, and made a total of 4 appearances for the club, without scoring a goal.

On 16 October 2020, Abraham joined League One side Plymouth Argyle on loan until January 2021.

On 29 January 2021, Abraham joined Scottish Championship side Raith Rovers on loan until the end of the 2020–21 season.

In July 2021 Abraham joined League Two club Newport County on loan for the 2021–22 season. He made his debut for Newport on 7 August 2021 as a second half substitute in the 1–0 League Two win against Oldham Athletic. Abraham scored his first goal for Newport on 10 August 2021 in the 1–0 EFL Cup first round win against Ipswich Town. He was released by Fulham at the end of the 2021–22 season.

Walsall 
On 26 July 2022 he signed for Walsall. He moved on loan to Oldham Athletic in October 2022. Having scored once in eight appearances, on 28 December 2022 his loan was extended until the end of the season.

Career statistics

References

2000 births
Living people
Footballers from Greater London
English footballers
Association football forwards
Charlton Athletic F.C. players
Fulham F.C. players
Bristol Rovers F.C. players
Plymouth Argyle F.C. players
English Football League players
Black British sportsmen
English sportspeople of Nigerian descent
Raith Rovers F.C. players
Newport County A.F.C. players
Walsall F.C. players
Scottish Professional Football League players
Oldham Athletic A.F.C. players
National League (English football) players